Oasis: Supersonic is a 2016 British music documentary directed by Mat Whitecross. Asif Kapadia and James Gay-Rees, already awarded with an Oscar for the film Amy, worked on this film respectively as executive producer and film producer. The Production Companies associated with the film are Mint Pictures, Nemperor and On The Corner Films and is distributed in the UK by Entertainment One and Lorton Distribution.

Synopsis
The film details the history of the Britpop band Oasis during their formative years and the height of their success in the 1990s, featuring off-screen interviews with members of the band and people associated with them, set to archive video of concerts, contemporaneous interviews and backstage footage.

Reception

Box office 
Oasis: Supersonic opened in theatres for 16 days. It has grossed $242,867 in the United States and Canada and $1.2 million in other countries for a worldwide total of $1.5 million, and sales of its DVD/Blu-ray releases have cashed $182,049.

Critical response 
Oasis: Supersonic received positive reviews from critics. On review aggregator Rotten Tomatoes, the film has an approval rating of 84%, based on 55 reviews, with an average score of 7.1/10. The website's critical consensus reads, "Oasis: Supersonic forgoes a comprehensive approach to its multi-platinum subjects in favor of an appreciative—and stirring—look at their heady early years." On Metacritic, the film has a score of 71 out of 100, based on 16 critics, indicating "generally favorable reviews." In a positive review, David Ehrlich of Indiewire praised the documentary's insight into Liam and Noel's relationship, describing it as "a poignant and insightful look into one of the most openly fractious sibling rivalries of our time." The Guardians Peter Bradshaw was critical on the absence of the group's post-1996 period, as well as the disregarding of the band's chart battle with Blur in 1995, Noel's endorsement of Tony Blair and the band's decline in popularity. He gave the film three out of five stars. Brian Tallerico expressed similar sentiments in a review for RogerEbert.com, giving it two and a half out of four stars. He summarised: "While Oasis: Supersonic is never boring, especially for fans, it's also not quite deep enough to justify its narrow focus, especially at its overlong running time."

Certifications

References

External links 
 
 

2016 films
2016 documentary films
2016 independent films
2010s English-language films
A24 (company) films
British documentary films
British independent films
Documentary films about musical groups
Films directed by Mat Whitecross
Oasis (band)
2010s American films
2010s British films